Jhamiela Smith Dunn is a Jamaican-born Canadian reggae musician, better known by her stage name, Jah'Mila.

Career 
Jah'Mila has been singing professionally since she was 17 years old. She performed background vocals for the band Dub Kartel. Jah'Mila performed at the 2019 Halifax Urban Folk Festival. In 2020, she released her song, "Chant Their Names", which critiqued police brutality. In 2022, Jah'Mila performed a tribute to Nina Simone with Symphony Nova Scotia.  Jah'Mila was described by The Coast as "arguably the biggest name in Halifax reggae."

In 2022, Jah'Mila released her debut LP, Roots Girl. The album was recorded in Jamaica. The Coast named Roots Girl one of their top ten albums of 2022. She is scheduled to perform with the Toronto Symphony Orchestra in April 2023.

Personal life 
Jhamiela Smith was born in Kingston, Jamaica. Her father is guitarist, Earl "Chinna" Smith. After visiting her mother in Halifax, Nova Scotia over a decade, she relocated there. While in Halifax, she met her partner, musician Adrian Dunn.

Discography 

 Roots Girl (2022)

References 

Musicians from Kingston, Jamaica
Musicians from Halifax, Nova Scotia
Black Nova Scotians
Black Canadian musicians
Canadian reggae musicians
Living people
Year of birth missing (living people)